Thomas Baroukh (born 15 December 1987) is a French rower. He competed in the Men's lightweight coxless four event at the 2012 Summer Olympics, finishing in 7th.  At the 2016 Olympics, he was part of the French lightweight coxless four that won the bronze medal.  The same team, consisting of Baroukh, Franck Solforosi, Guillaume Raineau and Thibault Colard, also won the bronze medal at the 2015 World Rowing Championships and bronze at the 2015 European Rowing Championships.  Baroukh's previous team, which included Solforosi, Raineau and Augustin Mouterde won the bronze at the 2013 and 2014 European Championships. Baroukh and Mouterde won the silver medal in the men's lightweight pair at the 2014 World Rowing Championships.

References

External links
 

1987 births
Living people
French male rowers
Olympic rowers of France
Rowers at the 2012 Summer Olympics
Rowers at the 2016 Summer Olympics
People from Le Chesnay
World Rowing Championships medalists for France
Olympic bronze medalists for France
Olympic medalists in rowing
Medalists at the 2016 Summer Olympics
Sportspeople from Yvelines
European Rowing Championships medalists